Hayashi limit is a theoretical constraint upon the maximum radius of a star for a given mass. When a star is fully within hydrostatic equilibrium—a condition where the inward force of gravity is matched by the outward pressure of the gas—the star can not exceed the radius defined by the Hayashi limit. This has important implications for the evolution of a star, both during the formulative contraction period and later when the star has consumed most of its hydrogen supply through nuclear fusion.

A Hertzsprung-Russell diagram displays a plot of a star's surface temperature against the luminosity. On this diagram, the Hayashi limit forms a nearly vertical line at about 3,500 K. The outer layers of low temperature stars are always convective, and models of stellar structure for fully convective stars do not provide a solution to the right of this line. Thus in theory, stars are constrained to remain to the left of this limit during all periods when they are in hydrostatic equilibrium, and the region to the right of the line forms a type of "forbidden zone". Note, however, that there are exceptions to the Hayashi limit. These include collapsing protostars, as well as stars with magnetic fields that interfere with the internal transport of energy through convection.

Red giants are stars that have expanded their outer envelope in order to support the nuclear fusion of helium. This moves them up and to the right on the H-R diagram. However, they are constrained by the Hayashi limit not to expand beyond a certain radius.

The Hayashi limit is named after Chūshirō Hayashi, a Japanese astrophysicist.

See also
 Hayashi track
 Eddington limit

References

Stellar evolution
Astrophysics